Rollin Samuel Williamson (May 23, 1839 – August 11, 1889) was an American politician, jurist, and telegraph operator from Vermont. After learning the telegraph trade in Boston, Massachusetts, Williamson moved to Illinois in 1857. He was appointed operator and station agent in Palatine, Illinois and studied law in his free time. He served a term in the Illinois House of Representatives then a term in the Illinois Senate. He then began to work up the ranks of the Illinois jurist system before his death.

Biography
Rollin Samuel Williamson was born in Cornwall, Vermont on May 23, 1839. He lived in the town until he was fourteen, attending public schools. Williamson moved to Boston, Massachusetts to work as a telegraph messenger boy. Two years later, he was promoted to operator and was assigned to offices through New England and New York. In 1857, he moved to Chicago, Illinois to work in telegraph office there. The manager sent him to Palatine, Illinois as a station agent and operator. During his down time on the job, he read law text books. Williamson occasionally helped locals with law issues. He was admitted to the bar in 1870.

Williamson's political connections urged him to run for public office. He was elected to the Illinois House of Representatives as a Republican in 1870, serving one two-year term. He then served a term in the Illinois Senate, serving two years. In 1880, he was elected judge of the Superior Court of Cook County, where he served a six-year term. In June 1887, he was elected to a four-year term to the Circuit Court of Cook County. He died before the term was complete.

Judge Williamson was a Methodist Episcopal and was the superintendent of the Sunday school at his church. He was active in Freemasonry and was Master of the Palatine lodge. He married Emma V. Squires on September 4, 1859. They had one daughter. In June 1889, Williamson had a mental breakdown; he had been subject to mood disorders for several years prior. Four weeks later, he had to be confined to his bed. Williamson died at his house in Palatine on August 11, 1889 and was buried there in Hillside Cemetery.

References

1839 births
1889 deaths
People from Cornwall, Vermont
Republican Party Illinois state senators
Republican Party members of the Illinois House of Representatives
People from Palatine, Illinois
19th-century American politicians
Judges of the Superior Court of Cook County
Judges of the Circuit Court of Cook County (pre-1964 reorganization)